This is a list of notable stand-up comedians from Canada.

A
 David Acer
 Brandon Ash-Mohammed
 Nicole Arbour

B
 Rachid Badouri
 Ian Bagg
 Irwin Barker
 Michel Barrette
 Ryan Belleville
 Trevor Boris
 Dave Broadfoot
 Aisha Brown
 Kyle Brownrigg
 Sophie Buddle
 Brent Butt

C
 Craig Campbell
 Jarrett Campbell
 Tommy Campbell
 Jim Carrey
 Maggie Cassella
 Martha Chaves
 Adam Christie
 Gavin Crawford
 Seán Cullen

D
 Ola Dada
 Ivan Decker
 Gerry Dee
 Eddie Della Siepe
 Charlie Demers
 D.J. Demers
 Yvon Deschamps
 Debra DiGiovanni
 Jon Dore
 Zabrina Douglas
 Jo-Anna Downey

E
 Sam Easton
 Derek Edwards
 Ophira Eisenberg
 Laurie Elliott

F
 Scott Faulconbridge
 Mark Forward
 Heidi Foss
 Stewart Francis

G
 Mayce Galoni
 Courtney Gilmour
 Todd Graham
 Jen Grant
 Tom Green

H
 Kristeen von Hagen
 Phil Hartman
 Ali Hassan
 Jeremy Hotz 
 Louis-José Houde
 Patrick Huard

J
 Ron James
 Ron Josol

K
 Anthony Kavanagh
 Graham Kay
 Peter Kelamis
 Simon King
 Rebecca Kohler
 Elvira Kurt

L
 Murray "The Unknown Comic" Langston
 Tony Law
 Dan Levy
 Gilson Lubin

M
 Mike MacDonald
 Norm Macdonald
 Cory Mack
 Shaun Majumder
 Jay Malone
 Howie Mandel
 Chanty Marostica
 Trent McClellan
 Jeff McEnery
 Bonnie McFarlane
 Rick Mercer
 Claudine Mercier
 Dave Merheje
 Darcy Michael
 Colin Mochrie
 Mike Myers

N
 Nick Nemeroff
 Phil Nichol
 Alex Nussbaum

P
 Candy Palmater
 Alan Park
 Pardis Parker
 Steve Patterson
 Jeff Paul
 Nikki Payne
 Russell Peters
 Jackie Pirico

R
 Simon Rakoff
 Caroline Rhea
 Kenny Robinson
 Darrin Rose
 Stéphane Rousseau
 Katherine Ryan

S
 Sugar Sammy
 Jacob Samuel
 Monty Scott
 Derek Seguin
 Steven Shehori
 Martin Short
 Erica Sigurdson
 DeAnne Smith
 Ron Sparks
 Winston Spear
 Tom Stade
 Tim Steeves
 David Steinberg
 Ryan Stiles

T
 Steph Tolev
 Angelo Tsarouchas

W
 Mike Ward
 Jason John Whitehead
 Harland Williams
 Mike Wilmot
 K. Trevor Wilson
 John Wing
 Glenn Wool

Z
 Pete Zedlacher

References

Stand-up